Maurice Stewart Collis (10 January 1889 – 12 January 1973) was an administrator in Burma (Myanmar) when it was part of the British Empire, and afterwards a writer on Southeast Asia, China and other historical subjects.

Life
He was born in Dublin, the son of an Irish solicitor, and went to Rugby School in 1903 and then in 1907 to the University of Oxford, where he studied history. He entered the Indian Civil Service in 1911 and was posted to Burma in 1912. He had postings at Sagaing and elsewhere. In 1917, the British army raised a Burmese brigade with which Collis went to Palestine, but he saw no action. In 1919, he went on leave and travelled in Europe. In the 1920s he was district commissioner in Arakan.In the 1920s he lived in Kyaukpyu.In 1929–1930, a period when relations between Burmese, Indians and British became particularly difficult, he was district magistrate in Rangoon. This period is narrated in his memoir Trials in Burma. He gives special attention to the political trial of Jatindra Mohan Sengupta, mayor of Calcutta, for sedition in impromptu speeches made during a brief visit to Rangoon in 1930; also to two criminal trials which became politically charged because they brought to light underlying attitudes of British merchants and army officers to Burmese people. Collis's judgements were (according to his own analysis) too independent to be pleasing to the then British Government of Burma, arousing the particular disapproval of his superior, Booth Gravely, Commissioner of the Pegu Division. After giving judgement in the last of these trials Collis was hastily moved to the post of Excise Commissioner. After returning to England in 1934, he wrote many books, including Siamese White and Foreign Mud, as well as art and literary criticism. At the age of 65 he turned his hand to painting.

His younger brothers were the writer John Stewart Collis and Robert Collis, a notable doctor and author; John and Robert were twins.

Works

Autobiographies
Trials in Burma (1930-31), Faber & Faber, 1938
The Journey Outward (1911-18), Faber & Faber, 1952
Into Hidden Burma (1919-34), Faber & Faber, 1953
The Journey Up: Reminiscences 1934-1968, Faber & Faber, 1970

Biographies
Siamese White (about Samuel White and the Anglo-Siamese War of 1687), Faber & Faber, 1936; revised 1951
The Grand Peregrination - Being the Life and Adventures of Fernão Mendes Pinto, Faber & Faber, London, 1949
Marco Polo, Faber & Faber, 1950
Cortés and Montezuma (about the Spanish conquest of Mexico), Faber & Faber, 1954
Nancy Astor: An Informal Biography, Faber & Faber, 1960
Raffles (Faber, London, 1966; about Stamford Raffles), Faber & Faber, 1966
Somerville and Ross: A Biography (about Edith Somerville and Violet Martin/"Martin Ross"), Faber & Faber, 1968
Stanley Spencer: A Biography (about the painter Stanley Spencer), Harvill Press, 1962

Histories
The Great Within (Peking and the Forbidden City), Faber & Faber, 1941 
British Merchant Adventurers (from the "Britain in Pictures" series), William Collins, 1942
The Land of the Great Image: Being Experiences of Friar Manrique in Arakan, Faber & Faber, 1943; New York: Alfred A. Knopf, 1943. Translated into Portuguese in 1944 (Na terra da Grande Imagem. Livraria Civilização. Porto).
Foreign Mud: Being an Account of the Opium Imbroglio at Canton in the 1830s and the Anglo-Chinese War That Followed, Faber & Faber, 1946
The First Holy One (about Confucius and his philosophy), Faber & Faber, 1948
Last and First in Burma (1941-48), Faber & Faber, 1956
The Hurling Time (England during the Fourteenth Century), Faber & Faber, 1958
Wayfoong: The Hongkong and Shanghai Banking Corporation, Faber & Faber, 1965

Fiction
She Was a Queen, Faber & Faber, 1937
Sanda Mala, Carrick & Evans, 1940
The Dark Door, Faber & Faber, 1940
Quest for Sita, Faber & Faber, 1946
The Mystery of Dead Lovers (with drawings by Cawthra Mulock), Faber & Faber, 1951

Drama
The Motherly and Auspicious: Being the Life of the Empress Dowager Tzu Hsi in the Form of a Drama, with an Introduction and Notes, Faber & Faber, 1943
White of Mergen (illustrated by Feliks Topolski), Faber & Faber, 1945
Lord of the Three Worlds, (with designs by Topolski), Faber & Faber, 1947

Other
Lords of the Sunset: A Tour in the Shan States (Collis toured the Shan States in Northern Burma in the winter of 1937, meeting the various local rulers, attending a funeral, and following a murder trial), Faber & Faber, 1938
Alva Paintings and Drawings, John Lane at the Bodley Head, 1942

References

Administrators in British Burma
20th-century Irish writers
20th-century male writers
20th-century British writers
People educated at Rugby School
1889 births
1973 deaths
Civil servants from Dublin (city)
Burmese writers
People from Yangon
British Army personnel of World War I